The 1953–54 NBA season was the Warriors' 8th season in the NBA.

Regular season

Season standings

x – clinched playoff spot

Record vs. opponents

Game log

Awards and records
 Neil Johnston, NBA All-Star Game
 Neil Johnston, NBA Scoring Champion
 Neil Johnston, All-NBA First Team

References

Golden State Warriors seasons
Philadelphia